Humberto Costas Tordera (born 17 December 1949 in Barcelona) is a sailor from Spain, who represented his country at the 1976 Summer Olympics in Kingston, Ontario, Canada as crew member in the Soling. With helmsman Juan Costas and fellow crew member Félix Anglada they took the 12th place.

References

Sources
 

Living people
1949 births
Sailors at the 1976 Summer Olympics – Soling
Olympic sailors of Spain
Sportspeople from Barcelona
Spanish male sailors (sport)
Snipe class sailors